Nizhnyaya Vodlitsa is a rural locality (a village) in Oshtinskoye Rural Settlement, Vytegorsky District, Vologda Oblast, Russia. The population was 44 as of 2002. There are 3 streets.

Geography 
Nizhnyaya Vodlitsa is located 53 km southwest of Vytegra (the district's administrative centre) by road. Perkhinskaya is the nearest rural locality.

References 

Rural localities in Vytegorsky District